The 2009 Intercity Football League season is the third since its establishment in 2007. It started from February 14, 2009.

At the end of 2008, the Chinese Taipei Football Association decided to merge the Enterprise Football League into the Intercity Football League, and therefore the latter became the highest-ranked football league in Taiwan. 

The league included two divisions. Division A consisted of six teams, and the remaining teams participated in Division B. The last-placed team in Division A would be relegated to Division B while the champion of Division B would move up to Division A.

New league regulations required each team to be named after the administrative division in which they were located. Each team also needed two-thirds of its players to reside in the area for at least one month.

Qualifications
Taipei City Tatung, Tainan County, and Kaohsiung Taipower automatically qualified for Division A after finishing in the top four places in the 2008 season. The remaining three Division A places were decided via a qualification tournament, which took place at the Pailing Sport Park January 1-4, 2009. There were six teams competing in the tournament: Miaoli County, Kaohsiung City, Kaohsiung City Yoedy (高市耀迪), Yilan County, Taipei County Hanchuang (北縣悍創), and Tainan City. Taipei County Hanchuang, Kaohsiung City Yaoti, and Kaohsiung City qualified for Division A after finishing in the top 3 places in the qualification tournament.

Division A

Table

Results

Venues

Division B

Teams
 Miaoli County FC
 Taipei County Stars FC (北縣明星) Taipei County Stars consists of players from Taipei Football Club, No Limit Soccer Team, and expatriates. The head coach is David Camhi. The team is sponsored by the Master Football Academy (明星足球訓練館).
 Taipei County Sanchung FC  (北縣三重)  Taipei County Sanchung  football team consists of students and graduates of National San Chung Senior High School. Most of them are still high-school students, therefore they have the lowest average age among all participating teams. 
 Taitung County Kuoyuan FC (東縣國源)
 Yilan County FC Yilan County football team consists of students and graduates of National Yilan Senior High School. They are considered the strongest team in the Division B. Notable players include Lo Chih-an and Lo Chih-en.

Table

Results

Source: Chinese Taipei Football Association

Relegation/Promotion playoffs

Taipei County Hanchuang won the playoff 25-0 in aggregate and remained in Division A.

References

External links
 League records in RSSSF

Top level Taiwanese football league seasons
Intercity Football League seasons
Taipei
1